The Georgia Power Company Corporate Headquarters is a 24-story,  skyscraper in downtown Atlanta, Georgia serving Georgia Power, a subsidiary of Southern Company. The prior Georgia Power headquarters building was in downtown Atlanta at the corner of Alabama and Forsyth streets in the former Atlanta Constitution Building.

Passive solar design
Completed in 1981 the building utilizes 4,500 tons (4,000 metric tons) of structural steel, and its floors have a passive solar design, with each floor on the south-facing side extending  beyond the one below. In summer, when the sun is high in the sky, each extension partially shades the windows below; in winter, when the sun is lower in the southern sky, it shines directly into the windows to assist with space heating. This design allows for the building to use nearly 60% less energy than most other buildings of the sort. Because of this incremental increase in floor size from the ground to the roof on the southern facade, the building is sometimes referred to as the "Leaning Tower of Power".

Solar thermal project
When the building opened, it featured an experimental solar thermal project on the south plaza [see "Further reading" below], which was dismantled after a few years due to maintenance costs and scarcity and expense of replacement parts.

References 

Headquarters in the United States
Office buildings in Atlanta
Office buildings completed in 1981
Cecil Alexander buildings